Klimovets is a gender-neutral Slavic surname. Notable people with the surname include:

Andrej Klimovets (born 1974), Belarusian-German handball player
Natalya Safronava (née Klimovets in 1974), Belarusian triple jumper

Slavic-language surnames